Tylenchidae is a family of nematodes. They are an important group of soil dwelling species that frequently contributes as much as 30% to the nematode species richness of soil samples. They diverged relatively early on and many species pose little risk to economically important plant species. Due to their early divergence, species tend to have relatively basal characteristics. They tend to be small nd slender with small and delicate piercing mouthparts.

It contains the following subfamilies and genera:

Atylenchinae
Aglenchus
Antarctenchus
Atylenchus
Caslenchus
Pleurotylenchus

Boleodorinae
Atetylenchus
Basiria
Boleodorus
Neopsilenchus
Neothada
Psilenchus
Ridgellus
Thada

Ecphyadophorinae
Chilenchus
Ecphyadophora
Ecphyadophoroides
Epicharinema
Lelenchus
Mitranema
Tenunemellus
Tremonema
Ultratenella

Tylenchinae
Allotylenchus
Cervoannulatus
Cucullitylenchus
Discotylenchus
Filenchus
Fraglenchus
Gracilancea
Irantylenchus
Malenchus
Miculenchus
Polenchus
Sakia
Silenchus
Tanzanius
Tylenchus

Tylodorinae
Arboritynchus
Campbellenchus
Caphalenchus
Eutylenchus
Tylodorus

References 

Tylenchida
Nematode families